Gaza was a battle honour awarded to units of the British and Imperial Armies that took part in one or more of the following engagements in the Great War:
First Battle of Gaza, 26 Mar 1917
Second Battle of Gaza, 19 Apr 1917
Third Battle of Gaza, 31 Oct–7 Nov 1917

References

Battle honours of the British Army